Kaiserschmarrn or Kaiserschmarren (Emperor's Mess) is a lightly sweetened pancake that takes its name from the Austrian emperor (Kaiser) Franz Joseph I, who was fond of this fluffy shredded pancake. It is served as a dessert or as a light lunch alongside apple sauce and contains raisins or dried cranberries.

Kaiserschmarrn is a popular meal or dessert in Austria, Bavaria, and many parts of the former Austro-Hungarian empire, e.g. Hungary, Slovenia, and northern Croatia, which usually use the name as a loan word or translations of it. In Slovenia, it is called "cesarski praženec" or "šmorn". Its Hungarian name is "császármorzsa"; its Czech name is "(Císařský) trhanec" or "kajzršmorn". In Slovak it is named "Císarský trhanec".

Etymology 
The word "Schmarren" is related to scharren (to scrape) and schmieren (to smear [see schmear]).

Description 

Kaiserschmarren is a light, caramelized pancake made from a sweet batter using flour, eggs, sugar, salt, and milk, fried in butter. Kaiserschmarren can be prepared in different ways. When making Kaiserschmarren the egg whites are usually separated from the yolk and beaten until stiff; then the flour and the yolks are mixed with sugar, and the other ingredients are added, including: nuts, cherries, plums, apple jam, or small pieces of apple, or caramelized raisins and slivered almonds. The latter ingredients (nuts, cherries, plums, apple jam, or small pieces of apple, or caramelized raisins and chopped almonds) are not part of the original recipe, but additions made by cooks based on their personal preferences. The original recipe only includes rum-soaked raisins.

The pancake is shredded using two forks during frying and usually sprinkled with powdered sugar, then served hot with apple or plum sauce or various fruit compotes, including plum, lingonberry, strawberry, or apple. Kaiserschmarren is eaten like a dessert, or it can also be eaten for lunch at tourist places like mountainside restaurants and taverns in the Austrian Alps, as a filling meal.

Traditionally, Kaiserschmarren is accompanied with Zwetschgenröster, a fruit compote made out of plums.

Varieties 
Like the closely related dish Sterz the Schmarrn derived from the simple but hearty cuisine of the alpine regions, there are different versions like Erdäpfelschmarrn (with potatoes), Äpfelschmarrn (with apples) or Kirschschmarren (with cherries), usually prepared on an open fireplace of a so-called Rauchkuchl. The Kaiserschmarrn is simply a more refined and richer version of this former staple food, which sometimes consisted of only flour and lard.

History 

It is generally agreed that the dish was first prepared for the Austrian Emperor Francis Joseph I (1830–1916). There are several stories. One apocryphal story involves the Emperor and his wife, Elisabeth of Bavaria, of the House of Wittelsbach. Obsessed with maintaining a minimal waistline, the Empress Elisabeth directed the royal chef to prepare only light desserts for her, much to the consternation and annoyance of her notoriously austere husband. Upon being presented with the chef's confection, she found it too rich and refused to eat it. The exasperated Francis Joseph quipped, “Now let me see what 'Schmarren' our chef has cooked up.” It apparently met his approval as he finished his and even his wife's serving.

Another story is that Francis Joseph and his wife were traveling the Alps and stopped by a farmer's home for lunch. The farmer was so nervous that he threw all the fanciest ingredients he had into a pan to make a delicious pancake; worse yet, due to his nervousness and shaky hands he shredded the pancake. Hoping to cover up the mess he then covered it with plum jam. Luckily, the Kaiser thought it was delicious.

Another popular tale is that his wife was a poor cook and was not adept at flipping a pancake. She decided to play to her strengths and shred the pancakes instead and would serve them up to the Kaiser on a regular basis with jam. He liked them with jam. It was his favourite dessert.

References

External links 
Kaiserschmarrn and other Austrian recipes: visit-salzburg.net

Austrian desserts
Hungarian desserts
Pancakes